127th may refer to:

127th Baluch Light Infantry, an infantry regiment of the British Indian Army
127th Battalion (12th York Rangers), CEF, a unit in the Canadian Expeditionary Force during the First World War
127th Command and Control Squadron, a command and control unit of the Kansas Air National Guard
127th Delaware General Assembly, a meeting of the Delaware Senate and the Delaware House of Representatives
127th Infantry Regiment (United States), traces its origins to the 4th Infantry Battalion, Wisconsin National Guard
127th Machine Gun Artillery Division, a division of the Russian Ground Forces
127th meridian east, a line of longitude 127° east of Greenwich
127th meridian west, a line of longitude 127° west of Greenwich
127th Regiment of Foot, an infantry regiment of the British Army, created in 1794 and disbanded in 1796
127th Street Repertory Ensemble, a theater group based in Harlem, Manhattan, New York City
127th Wing, a fighter and air refueling unit located at Selfridge ANGB, Michigan
Ohio 127th General Assembly, the legislative body of the state of Ohio in the years 2007 and 2008
Ohio House of Representatives, 127th General Assembly, in session in 2007 and 2008

See also
127 (number)
AD 127, the year 127 (CXXVII) of the Julian calendar
127 BC